Claudia Fabiola Galvis (born 3 June 1990) is a Bolivian footballer who played as a left back. She was a member of the Bolivia women's national team.

Early life
Galvis hails from the Santa Cruz Department.

Club career
Galvis has played for Gerimex and Mundo Futuro.

International career
Galvis played for Bolivia at senior level in two Copa América Femenina editions (2010 and 2014) and the 2014 South American Games.

References

1990 births
Living people
Women's association football fullbacks
Bolivian women's footballers
People from Santa Cruz Department (Bolivia)
Bolivia women's international footballers
Competitors at the 2014 South American Games